Paterson D. Joseph (born 22 June 1964) is an English actor and author. He appeared in the Royal Shakespeare Company productions of King Lear and Love's Labour's Lost in 1990. On television he is best known for his roles in Casualty (1997–1998), as Alan Johnson in Channel 4 sitcom Peep Show (2003–2015), Green Wing (2004–2006),  Survivors (2008–2010), Boy Meets Girl (2009), as DI Wes Layton in Law & Order: UK (2013–2014), as Holy Wayne in The Leftovers (2014–15), as DCI Mark Maxwell in Safe House (2015–2017), and as Connor Mason in Timeless (2016–2018). His film roles include The Beach (2000), Greenfingers (2001), Æon Flux (2005) and The Other Man (2008).

Early life
Joseph was born on 22 June 1964 in Willesden Green, London to parents from Saint Lucia. He attended Cardinal Hinsley R.C. High School in north-west London, a predominantly Irish-Catholic school. He has described himself as a "terrible bunker" whilst at school, opting to spend the best part of two years in the local public library instead.

He worked briefly as a catering assistant at a hospital, before deciding to pursue acting as a profession. Joseph first trained at the Studio '68 of Theatre Arts, London (South Kensington Library) from 1983 to 1985 with Robert Henderson. He later attended LAMDA, before going on to perform for the Royal Shakespeare Company and The Royal National Theatre.

Career

Theatre
In 1991, Joseph won second prize in the Ian Charleson Awards, for his 1990 performances of Oswald in King Lear, Dumaine in Love's Labour's Lost, and the Marquis de Mota in The Last Days of Don Juan, all at the Royal Shakespeare Company. In 1992 he starred as Richard Henry in Blues for Mister Charlie by James Baldwin, directed by Greg Hersov at the Royal Exchange, Manchester.

Joseph's theatre credits include the title role in Othello at the Royal Exchange, Manchester, as well as parts in Henry IV, King Lear, and Hamlet for a performance in New York City. In 2012 he played Brutus in a performance by the RSC of Julius Caesar set in Africa. In 2004 he undertook a project, filmed for Channel 4 in a documentary entitled My Shakespeare, to direct a version of Romeo & Juliet, using 20 young non-actors from the deprived Harlesden area of London.

In 2006, he became a patron of OffWestEnd.com, a listings site for theatre outside the mainstream. Other stage appearances in 2006 and 2007 include the leads in The Royal Hunt of the Sun and The Emperor Jones at the Olivier Theatre, London. In 2015, Sancho: An Act of Remembrance, a solo play written and performed by Joseph and based on the life of Ignatius Sancho, was staged in Oxford and Birmingham, and toured in the US starting in October.

In late 2019 and early 2020 Joseph starred as Ebenezer Scrooge at the Old Vic Theatre in London in their production of A Christmas Carol.

Television
He has played many roles in British television programmes, both drama and comedy. These include Reuben in William and Mary, alongside Martin Clunes; Mark Grace in Casualty; the Marquis de Carabas in Neverwhere; Alan Johnson in Peep Show; Lyndon Jones in Green Wing; and Shorty in the first episode of Jericho.

Joseph also appeared in the acclaimed drama Sex Traffic (2004), in the 2005 TV version of Kwame Kwei-Armah's acclaimed play Elmina's Kitchen and in the Doctor Who episodes "Bad Wolf" and "The Parting of the Ways" as Rodrick, a contestant on a futuristic version of the Weakest Link game show. He has also appeared in various supporting roles in Dead Ringers. In 2006 he appeared in the television sketch show That Mitchell and Webb Look, in which he played Simon, a contestant on the game show Numberwang.

In 2007, Joseph played Space Marshall Clarke in two series of the BBC sci-fi sitcom Hyperdrive, and was Benjamin Maddox in the BBC drama series Jekyll. Joseph also provided the voice of K.O. Joe in Chop Socky Chooks.

From 2008 - 2010, he played Greg Preston in Survivors, the BBC remake of the 1970s science-fiction drama of the same name. Also in 2008, Joseph appeared as former hitman Patrick Finch in Series 1, Episode 5 of The Fixer.

In 2009, he was the bookmakers' favourite to become Doctor Whos Eleventh Doctor, but the role was awarded to Matt Smith.

Joseph played DI Wes Layton in Law & Order: UK from 2013 to 2014.

He played the messianic "Holy Wayne" Gilchrest on the original HBO dramatic series The Leftovers, which began airing in 2014, and General Arnold Gaines on You, Me and the Apocalypse.

He took up the main role of Connor Mason in the television series Timeless, which ended in 2018.

In 2020, Joseph played the part of Home Secretary Kamal Hadley in the series of Noughts + Crosses.

As voice actor, Joseph provided the narration for the National Geographic series Mega Cities from 2005 to 2011, Wild Russia in 2009 and the BBC Two documentary Inside Obama's White House in 2016. He played Tyler in the BBC Switch film Rules of Love in 2010.

Film
Joseph's first feature film role was as Benbay in Jim Sheridan's In the Name of the Father.

In 2000, Joseph appeared as Keaty in Danny Boyle's adventure drama film The Beach, which starred Leonardo DiCaprio. In the same year, he also appeared in The Long Run and Greenfingers.

In 2005, he portrayed Giroux in the science-fiction action film Æon Flux, which starred Charlize Theron. Then in 2008 he played a supporting role in The Other Man, opposite Liam Neeson and Antonio Banderas.

Joseph is set to star as villain Arthur Slugworth, alongside Timothée Chalamet as Willy Wonka, in the upcoming musical fantasy film Wonka, directed by Paul King.

He has also appeared in several short films, including Stop the World, directed by Richard Leaf. He will voice the character Victor in upcoming drama short film Bet Your Bottom Dollar.

Voice work
In 2011, Joseph returned to Doctor Who, where he appeared in the audio drama Earth Aid, playing Victor Espinosa. In November 2016 he played the title role in the BBC radio adaptation of the short story by Neil Gaiman, How the Marquis Got His Coat Back. Joseph had previously played the part of the Marquis de Carabas in the 1996 BBC TV six-part drama Neverwhere. He played the role of Colonel Arbuthnott in the Audible production of Murder on the Orient Express.

Joseph read the BBC Radio 4 abridgement of George Lamming's 1953 debut novel In the Castle of My Skin first broadcast in December 2020.

Writing
In October 2022, Joseph's debut novel The Secret Diaries of Charles Ignatius Sancho was released. The book charts the life of Charles Ignatius Sancho through fictionalised diary entries, letters and commentary.

Chancellor of Oxford Brookes University
In October 2022 it was announced that Joseph will be the next Chancellor of Oxford Brookes University.

Personal life
Joseph lived in the Loire Valley with his French wife Emmanuelle and their son, before moving back to his native London. Joseph supports the Brazil national football team.

Filmography

Television

Film

Stage

Audio and radio

References

External links

1964 births
Alumni of the London Academy of Music and Dramatic Art
English male television actors
English male stage actors
English male radio actors
English male voice actors
English male film actors
British male Shakespearean actors
Royal Shakespeare Company members
Living people
Black British male actors
British people of Saint Lucian descent
20th-century English male actors
21st-century English male actors